Basa is a genus of cicadas in the family Cicadidae. There is at least one described species in Basa, B. singularis.

References

Further reading

 
 
 
 

Cicadini
Cicadidae genera